Trần Quảng Vận, pen name Trần Lâm (1922–2011), was a Vietnamese journalist. He was director of Voice of Vietnam for 43 years.

References

1922 births
2011 deaths
Vietnamese journalists
Alternates of the 4th Central Committee of the Communist Party of Vietnam
Members of the 5th Central Committee of the Communist Party of Vietnam